Presidential elections were held in Croatia on 28 December 2014 and 11 January 2015, the sixth such elections since independence in 1991. Only four candidates contested the elections, the lowest number since 1997. Incumbent President Ivo Josipović, who had been elected as the candidate of the Social Democratic Party in 2009–2010 but ran as an independent, was eligible to seek reelection for a second and final five-year term. As no candidate received 50% of the vote in the first round in December 2014, a run-off took place in January 2015 between the two candidates with the most votes; Josipović and Kolinda Grabar-Kitarović. Grabar-Kitarović went on to win the elections by a slim margin of 32,509 votes or 1.48%, making her Croatia's first female president.

The elections were the second to have a woman in the run-off, the first having been the 2005 elections, and also featured the youngest candidate to run in a presidential contest, Ivan Vilibor Sinčić, aged 24. The election of Grabar-Kitarović was the first victory for the Croatian Democratic Union (HDZ) in a presidential election since the death of Franjo Tuđman in December 1999, making her the first right-wing President of Croatia in 15 years. The defeat of Josipović marked the first time that an incumbent Croatian President had failed to win reelection for a second five-year term, with both his predecessors Franjo Tuđman and Stjepan Mesić serving two terms. The number of votes (1,114,900) received by Grabar-Kitarović in the second round was the lowest number of votes received by an elected Croatian President until that point in time (later being surpassed by the number of votes for Zoran Milanović in the 2019-20 election). Grabar-Kitarović was sworn in as the fourth President of Croatia on 15 February 2015, becoming the youngest person to take office as President of the Republic of Croatia, aged 46 years and 295 days.

Background and rules
In mid-October 2014 the SDP-led government proposed adopting a new electoral law by February 2015. SDP's parliamentary speaker Josip Leko stated that the party's position in consultation with the Venice Commission was that the electoral law should not be changed within a year prior to an election. However, the new Law on the Election of the President of the Republic of Croatia was subsequently voted in by the SDP-led parliamentary majority on 24 October. The opposition Croatian Democratic Union (HDZ) walked out on the vote criticizing the timing, while most of the parliament's minority representatives voted against the law due to a lack of consultation of parliamentary groups. The SDP's Peđa Grbin, head of the parliament's constitutional committee jeered the opposition: "I understand why my colleagues from HDZ are opposed, since they won't have to wait until midnight to find that they've also lost these elections" - ostensibly in reference to a part of the law which shortened the electoral silence from midnight on election day to the closing of the polls.

One of the more significant changes to the law involved limiting voting abroad to consular offices. This had the effect of greatly reducing the number of polling stations in neighbouring Bosnia and Herzegovina: from 124 in the 2009-10 presidential elections to 15 in the current election. The Croatian People's Assembly, a grouping of Croat parties in Bosnia and Herzegovina, protested at the reduction. Overall the number of polling stations abroad was reduced from 250 to 90.

On 20 November Croatian prime minister Zoran Milanović called presidential elections to take place on 28 December.

Opinions polls in late 2014 showed the Croatian public with high disapproval ratings of the country's direction and the government: 82% and 79% respectively.

Campaign before the official start
Kolinda Grabar-Kitarović was first discussed as the Croatian Democratic Union's candidate in May 2014 after the party emerged with the most votes and seats nationally in the European Parliament elections. Her candidature was confirmed by party leader Tomislav Karamarko on 12 June.

In October, president Josipović had to deal with the fallout from an article written by his chief analyst Dejan Jović claiming that the 1991 Croatian independence referendum was "quite illiberal and was not held in free and honest circumstances". Josipović subsequently dismissed Jović.

Candidates
Candidates seeking nomination first had to submit a minimum of 10,000 citizens' signatures to the State Electoral Commission (Državno izborno povjerenstvo or DIP) in order for their candidacy to be formally accepted. The signatures had to be collected in a period of twelve days, from 25 November to 6 December. The deadline for submissions was midnight, 6 December, with most candidates submitting a much larger number of signatures as a show of support. Following the submissions, DIP had two days to check the validity of signatures and announced a final list of candidates by midnight on 8 December. On 9 December the campaign officially started, and lasted for 18 days until 26 December, celebrated in Croatia as St. Stephen's Day.

The first to submit his signatures was Milan Kujundžić who handed them in on 5 December. Incumbent president Ivo Josipović submitted his 203,875 signatures along with prime minister Zoran Milanović and other members of his cabinet on the day of the deadline. Kolinda Grabar-Kitarović and Ivan Sinčić both also submitted the required signatures later that day.

Withdrawn candidate bids
 Anto Đapić withdrew on 5 December, endorsing Kolinda Grabar-Kitarović.
 Ivan Grubišić withdrew on 6 December, endorsing Ivan Rude.
 Ivan Rude, lawyer who handled pre-bankruptcy settlements at several large companies and candidate of the non-parliamentary Voice of Reason party, he ran on left-wing populist and worker's rights platform. Withdrew on 6 December after failing to collect 10,000 signatures required to formally submit his bid.

Failed candidacies
 Ivan Bavčević submitted 7,600 signatures to the electoral commission on December 6 and was rejected.
 Ratko Dobrović submitted no signatures to the electoral commission claiming that they are "blank signatures".
 Slobodan Midžić not submitted signatures on the prescribed form. Instead he offered a CD on which, as he claims, is about 500 thousand signatures. He is from Velika Kladuša (BiH). Midžić had also failed to nominate himself for 2009 presidential election.
 Ivica Dukić submitted only 800 signatures because "in Split and Zagreb it is raining and people are suspicious".
 Vesna Balenović, supported Milan Kujundžić
 Tomislav Šutalo, businessman from Valpovo
 Ivan Valek, architect and member of The Church of Jesus Christ of Latter-day Saints
 Iva Anzulović, reporter. She said that "she is apolitical and always a reporter"
 Tomislav Opačak, businessman from Slavonski Brod. At the time, he was due to serve a prison sentence for a traffic violation. He said that "there never was a great president who did not serve prison time", mentioning Josip Broz Tito and Franjo Tuđman.

Campaign
During the course of the first-round campaign the head of the president's War Veterans Council Vlado Marić gave his resignation in protest of Josipović. His resignation cited a lack of an "appropriate reaction to multiple attempts to show either [Josipović] or his close associates, personally or through the War Veterans Council, of the difficulty and seriousness of the problems affecting Croatian veterans".

Incumbent president Ivo Josipović addressed his supporters on the night of the first round of elections. During his speech he stated "Too much blood has been spilled for Croatia and too many defenders died that we would give Croatia up to those who don't deserve it" in reference to the opposition challenger Grabar-Kitarović. The Croatian Democratic Union criticized the president's rhetoric as "dirty and aggressive" and stressed that while Josipović "speaks of blood", their candidate offers "peace, unity and optimism".

After the first round, third place candidate Ivan Sinčić was asked which of the two candidates he would support in the second round to which he replied that he could not support either due to moral reasons. Sinčić's Živi zid told his supporters to spoil their ballots in the second round by entering Sinčić's name on the ballot. Vice-president of the SDP government Milanka Opačić called Sinčić a "colourful lie" in an interview from the Josipović campaign headquarters on the night of the first-round elections. In response Sinčić's campaign manager Dušan Cvetanović called SDP and the government "a colourful lie which ever fewer people have faith in". SDP vice-president and director of operations for Josipović's campaign Željka Antunović also said that "Sinčić acted like an anarchist and didn't offer solutions". Nevertheless, the following day Josipović reached out to Sinčić's voters: "I hope that those voters who were for Sinčić recognize that this is a field where we're playing together". Sinčić continued his work with Živi zid after the first round. He was arrested during an attempt to prevent an eviction in Zagreb on 8 January.

Fourth placed candidate Milan Kujundžić implicitly endorsed Grabar-Kitarović during his concession speech on the first-round election night stating that "Croatia will get a new president". The Croatian Party of Rights which had backed Kujundžić subsequently endorsed Grabar-Kitarović.

Grabar-Kitarović entered the second round as only the second woman to do so after Jadranka Kosor in 2005, and attempting to be the first to win the presidency. In prime minister Milanović's new-year interview with RTL he referred to her as a "prima ballerina" in the previous HDZ government when she served as minister. In the interview Milanović also referred to Croatian Catholic bishops as "the most backward in Europe" and referred to Orthodox Christmas as the only non-working day in the coming weeks, despite Ephipany being celebrated as a national non-working holiday on 6 January and Orthodox Christmas being an optional non-working holiday reserved for those Orthodox observing it.

Josipović continued with some events in his presidential role during the campaign. On 6 January he was to attend the Serbian National Council's Christmas party. Traditionally, the event is attended by the president although Josipović had last been in 2012 after a falling-out with the head of the council Milorad Pupovac.

Campaign spending

Debates - Second round
Grabar-Kitarović and Josipović were scheduled to have three head-to-head debates before the second round: 
RTL Televizija - Sunday January 4. The debate was watched by over 805,000 people. 
Nova TV - Thursday January 8
Croatian Radiotelevision - Friday January 9

Opinion polls

First round

Second round

Conduct
Candidate's observers - first round: 
Kolinda Grabar-Kitarović - 9,700
Ivo Josipović - 8,728
Milan Kujundžić - 1,875
Ivan Sinčić - 362
Political parties' observers - first round:
Sustainable Development of Croatia (endorsing Josipović) - 191
Croatian Peasant Party (endorsing Grabar-Kitarović) - 52
Croatian People's Party (endorsing Josipović) - 17
Non-governmental observers - first round:
In the Name of the Family - 682
Observer (Promatrač) organization - 53
Student Catholic Centre Palma - 39
GONG - 15
Croatian Responsible Society - 5
Non-governmental observers - second round:
In the Name of the Family - 845
Observer (Promatrač) organization - 53
GONG - 15
Croatian Responsible Society - 5

Results

First round results by county

Second round results by county

Analysis
Incumbent president Ivo Josipović and opposition candidate Kolinda Grabar-Kitarović received the greatest number of votes in the first round. The result was notable for being much closer than expected in pre-election polls, with respective vote shares of 38.46% and 37.22%. Political analyst Žarko Puhovski criticized the polls for having an inadequate sample and being overly reliant on telephone polling.

The new electoral law put into place by the Milanović government had the effect of greatly reducing the number of polling stations in neighbouring Bosnia and Herzegovina for Croatian citizens residing there. This translated to a greatly reduced turnout there: from 50,859 in the first round of the 2009 presidential elections to 7,372 in 2014. The Croatian Democratic Union agreed with its sister party in Bosnia and Herzegovina on organizing free buses for voters to polling stations for the second round. Kolinda Grabar-Kitarović had received an overwhelming majority there in the first round. Josipović's campaign complained to the State Electoral Commission that offering free rides to polling stations constituted a donation which would violate electoral rules. However, votes of the diaspora still wouldn't change the outcome.

Around 60% of voters between ages 18 and 29 voted for Grabar-Kitarović, while Josipović was favoured by voters older than 60.

References

Presidential elections in Croatia
Croatia
President
President
Croatia
President
President
Modern history of Croatia
Croatia
Croatia